Mount Hiroe is a rocky mountain,  high, situated  northwest of Breidvågnipa Peak and  northeast of Hiroe Point, on the coast of Queen Maud Land, Antarctica. It was first mapped by H.E. Hansen from air photos taken by the Lars Christensen Expedition, 1936–37. The name "Hiroe-yama" (broad bay mountain) was applied by the headquarters of the Japanese Antarctic Research Expedition in 1973 and follows Japanese research in this area.

References

Mountains of Queen Maud Land
Prince Harald Coast